Hechtia caudata is a plant species in the genus Hechtia. This species is endemic to Mexico.

References

caudata
Endemic flora of Mexico